Jesse James as the Outlaw is a 1921 American silent Western film directed by Franklin B. Coates, cast designed by Edgar Kellar and starring Jesse James, Jr., Diana Reed and Marguerite Hungerford.

It is the sequel of Jesse James Under the Black Flag, released the same year. Both films were featured in theaters and were not financial successes.

Cast
 Jesse James, Jr. as Jesse James
 Diana Reed as Lucille James, Jesse's Daughter
 James Neill as Robert Standing, Lucille's Sweetheart
 Marguerite Hungerford as Zee Mimms, Mrs. Jesse James
 Ralph Johnson as Judge Bowman
 Hortense Espey as Mrs. Bowman
 William Baker as Jesse's Step-Father
 Mrs. Cart as Jesse's Mother
 Frances Coffey as Susan, Jesse's Sister
 Elmo Red Fox as Chief Red Fox
 Gilbert Holmes as Pee Wee Holmes, Rodeo Bulldogger
 Harry Hoffman as Cole Younger

References

Bibliography

External links

 
 
 

1921 films
1921 Western (genre) films
American black-and-white films
1920s English-language films
Biographical films about Jesse James
Films directed by Franklin B. Coates
Silent American Western (genre) films
1920s American films